Leptadrillia parkeri is an extinct species of sea snail, a marine gastropod mollusk in the family Drilliidae.

Description
The length of the shell attains 22.3 mm, its diameter 6.1 mm.

Distribution
This extinct marine species was found in Pliocene strata of Jamaica; age range: 3.6 to 2.588 Ma

References

 A. J. W. Hendy, D. P. Buick, K. V. Bulinski, C. A. Ferguson, and A. I. Miller. 2008. Unpublished census data from Atlantic coastal plain and circum-Caribbean Neogene assemblages and taxonomic opinions

External links
 Fossilworks: Leptadrillia parkeri

parkeri